Conus lecourtorum is a species of sea snail, a marine gastropod mollusk in the family Conidae, the cone snails, cone shells or cones.

These snails are predatory and venomous. They are capable of "stinging" humans.

Description
The size of the shell attains 16 mm.

Distribution
This marine species in the Indian Ocean off Mauritius.

References

 Lorenz F. (2011) A new species of Rolaniconus from the western Indian Ocean (Gastropoda: Conidae). Schriften zur Malakozoologie 26: 37-40.
 Puillandre N., Duda T.F., Meyer C., Olivera B.M. & Bouchet P. (2015). One, four or 100 genera? A new classification of the cone snails. Journal of Molluscan Studies. 81: 1-23

External links
 To World Register of Marine Species
 

lecourtorum
Gastropods described in 2011